The welterweight was the third heaviest boxing weight class held as part of the Boxing at the 1904 Summer Olympics programme. The competition was held on Wednesday, September 21, 1904 and on Thursday, September 22, 1904. It was the first time the event, like all other boxing events, was held in Olympic competition. Welterweights had to be less than 65.8 kilograms. Four boxers competed.

Results

Note: Jack Egan originally won the silver medal in the lightweight competition and the bronze medal in the welterweight competition. Later, it was discovered that his real name was Frank Joseph Floyd, whereas AAU rules made it illegal to fight under an assumed name. In November 1905, the AAU disqualified Egan from all AAU competitions and ordered him to return all his prizes and medals. Russell van Horn was awarded the silver and Peter Sturholdt awarded the bronze in the lightweight competition while Joseph Lydon retained bronze in the welterweight competition.

References

Sources
 
 In November 1905 the AAU disqualified Egan
 IOC's medal database for 1904 Olympics

Welterweight